Yesterworlds is a compilation album by the Swedish melodic death metal band, Dark Tranquillity. It features their previously released and unreleased material: the demo version of Trail of Life Decayed, the EP version of A Moonclad Reflection, an unreleased promo tape from 1994 along with a song taken from the W.A.R. Compilation.

Track listing

Track information
Tracks 1-4 were originally released on the Trail of Life Decayed demo
Tracks 5-6 were originally released on the A Moonclad Reflection EP
Tracks 7-9 are promo versions from a 1994 tape and have not been previously released
Track 10 was originally released on W.A.R. Compilation Vol. 1 from 1994

Dark Tranquillity albums
2009 compilation albums
Century Media Records compilation albums